M. Thomas Mathew is an Indian literary critic, orator, translator and academic who  writes in Malayalam language. He has written a number of books on literary criticism such as Dhanthagopurathilekku Veendum, Ente Valmeekamevide, Ashante Seethayanam and Athmavinte Murivukal and has translated works into Malayalam which includes New Humanism written by M. N. Roy. He is a recipient of several honours including Sahitya Akademi Award, Vayalar Award and Kerala Sahitya Akademi Award for Literary Criticism.

Biography
Born on September 27, 1940 in Keekozhur, a small hamlet in Pathanamthitta district, in the south Indian state of Kerala, Thomas Mathew did his education at Christian College, Chengannur and Maharaja's College, Ernakulam and started his career as a lecturer at his alma meter, Christian College, Chengannur. He has also worked as a professor in other educational institutions in Kerala such as Government College, Chittoor, Victoria College, Palakkad, and Maharaja’s College, Ernakulam and as the principal in Panampilly Memorial Government College, Chalakkudy, Sree Neelakanta Government Sanskrit College Pattambi, and Government College, Munnar before superannuating in 1996. He also served as the Director of Kerala Bhasha Institute.

Thomas Mathew has published a number of books, covering the genres of literary criticism, and translation and has edited three anthologies of literary articles. His work, Athmavinte Murivukal fetched him the Kerala Sahitya Akademi Award for Literary Criticism in 2001. He was awarded Vayalar Award in 2009 for his work, Marar: Lavanyanubhavathinte Yuktishilpam. A recipient of the M. K. Sanu Award in 2020, he received the Sahitya Akademi Award for his work, Ashante Seethayanam, in 2022. He is also a recipient of C. B. Kumar Endowmment Prize of Kerala Sahitya Akademi, C. J. Father Vadakkel Award, Dr. C. P. Menon Memorial Award, Mar Gregorios Memorial Award and Dr. T. P. Sukumar Memorial Award.

Thomas Mathew lives in Changampuzha Nagar, in Kochi, Kerala.

Selected bibliography

Literary criticism and articles

Translations

Edited books

See also 

 M. K. Sanu
 M. Achuthan

References

External links 
 
 

1940 births
People from Kerala
Malayalam-language writers
Living people
20th-century Indian male writers
21st-century Indian male writers
Malayali people
Indian literary critics
Indian male essayists
Malayalam literary critics
People from Pathanamthitta district
Writers from Kerala
Recipients of the Sahitya Akademi Award in Malayalam
Recipients of the Kerala Sahitya Akademi Award